"She Can Rock It" is a song by the Power Station. Released as their only single from their 1996 album Living in Fear, it was the band’s fourth and final single. It featured "Power Trippin'" as its B-side, a rock-funk song written by the band for the US version of the album, and also "Charanga" written by Palmer. An alternate version of "Charanga" was released in 1998 on the Robert Palmer compilation album Woke Up Laughing.

The band recorded a live performance for Top of the Pops. Despite this, the single spent one week at number 63 on the UK Singles Chart.

References

1996 songs
1996 singles
The Power Station (band) songs
Songs written by Robert Palmer (singer)
Songs written by Andy Taylor (guitarist)
Songs written by John Taylor (bass guitarist)
Song recordings produced by Bernard Edwards